The 2016 Zhuhai Challenger was a professional tennis tournament played on hard courts. It was the first edition of the tournament which was part of the 2016 ATP Challenger Tour. It took place in Zhuhai, China between 7 and 13 March 2016.

Singles main-draw entrants

Seeds

1 Rankings as of February 29, 2016.

Other entrants
The following players received wildcards into the singles main draw:
  Altuğ Çelikbilek
  Gao Xin
  Ouyang Bowen
  Wang Chuhan

The following players received entry from the qualifying draw:
  Cheong-Eui Kim
  Kevin Krawietz
  Maximilian Neuchrist
  Lorenzo Sonego

Champions

Singles

  Thomas Fabbiano def.  Zhang Ze, 5–7, 6–1, 6–3

Doubles

  Gong Maoxin /  Yi Chu-huan def.  Hsieh Cheng-peng /  Wu Di, 2–6, 6–1, [10–5]

External links
Combined Main Draw

Zhuhai Challenger
Zhuhai Open